The Crown Prince of the State of Kuwait is the heir apparent to the Emir of Kuwait. Under Article 4 of the Constitution of Kuwait, this position can only be held by the descendants of Sheikh Mubarak Al-Sabah, and must be designated within a year of the Emir's accession. This designation is given effect by a combination of the Emir's nomination, and its approval by the National Assembly, as signified by a majority vote of its members in a special sitting. If this does not happen, the Constitution requires the Emir to nominate three descendants of Sheikh Mubarak Al-Sabah, of whom the National Assembly will pledge allegiance to one as the Crown Prince or heir apparent. To be appointed, the nominee must also have attained the age of majority, be of sound mind, and be the legitimate son of Muslim parents.

There are three successional customs which influence the choice of Crown Prince. First, the pick alternates between descendants of two of Sheikh Mubarak Al-Sabah's sons: Jaber II Al-Sabah and Salim Al-Mubarak Al-Sabah. Second, the Crown Prince is chosen by the Family Council, from among other elder members of the royal family. Third, the matter of succession is a family affair and kept secret. As such, it is not open to public debate.

Heirs apparent to the Emir of Kuwait (1921–present)

Vice Rulers of Kuwait (1921–1961)

Crown Princes of Kuwait (1962–present)

See also

Politics of Kuwait

Notes

References

External links
Amiri Diwan of Kuwait website

Crown Prince
Kuwait
Crown Prince